Sbarbaro is an Italian surname. Notable people with the surname include:

Eugenio Sbarbaro (born 1934), Italian Roman Catholic prelate 
Tony Sbarbaro (1897–1969), American jazz drummer

See also
Barbaro (surname)

Italian-language surnames